Borzewisko refers to the following places in Poland:

 Borzewisko, Poddębice County
 Borzewisko, Sieradz County